Mokhotlong Airport  is an airport serving Mokhotlong, the camptown of Mokhotlong District, Lesotho.

See also
Transport in Lesotho
List of airports in Lesotho

References

External links
 Mokhotlong Airport
 OurAirports - Lesotho
 Google Earth

Airports in Lesotho